is a former Japanese cyclist. He competed in the sprint and tandem events at the 1972 Summer Olympics.

References

External links
 

1951 births
Living people
Japanese male cyclists
Olympic cyclists of Japan
Cyclists at the 1972 Summer Olympics
Sportspeople from Fukushima Prefecture